Ilocos Sur's 2nd congressional district is one of the two congressional districts of the Philippines in the province of Ilocos Sur. It has been represented in the House of Representatives of the Philippines since 1916 and earlier in the Philippine Assembly from 1907 to 1916. The district consists of the city of Candon and adjacent municipalities of Alilem, Banayoyo, Burgos, Cervantes, Galimuyod, Gregorio del Pilar, Lidlidda, Nagbukel, Narvacan, Quirino, Salcedo, San Emilio, San Esteban, Santa, Santa Cruz, Santa Lucia, Santa Maria, Santiago, Sigay, Sugpon, Suyo and Tagudin. It is currently represented in the 19th Congress by Kristine Singson-Meehan.

Representation history

Election results

2022

2019

2016

2013

2010

See also
Legislative districts of Ilocos Sur

References

Congressional districts of the Philippines
Politics of Ilocos Sur
1907 establishments in the Philippines
Congressional districts of the Ilocos Region
Constituencies established in 1907